Hedningarna is the eponymous debut album by the Swedish band Hedningarna. It was released in 1989, when Hedningarna was still a group with three members. Unlike the other albums, the debut does not include amplified instruments and rhythm loops and is played entirely with acoustic instrumentation.

Using various instruments, such as hurdy-gurdies, moraharpas, bagpipes and fiddles, the album proves Hedningarnas' ability to mix old and new styles, and the album honors the old Scandinavian musical traditions, while managing to combine these with more modern sounds.

The album was later released on the NorthSide label.

Track listing
All song written by Anders Stake, except where noted.
 Polska After Pelle Fors – 3:30 (trad.)
 Förtvivlans Polska/Desperation Polska – 2:10
 Häxpolskan/The Witch Polska – 2:23
 Skavlåten/The Chafing Tune – 3:02
 Ölbackens Polska – 4:05
 Särna Gamla Brudmarsch/Old Särna Wedding March – 3:51 (trad.)
 Multihalling – 2:58
 Fulinghalling/Scamphalling – 5:33
 Polska After Olof Tillman – 4:35 (trad.)
 Doplåten/The Baptism Tune – 0:44
 Polska After Hins Anders – 1:44
 Lacknafta – 3:10
 Björnlåten/The Bear Tune – 3:49 (trad.)

Personnel
Anders Stake: Hardingfele, Three-String Keyed Fiddle, Swedish Bagpipes, Nyckelharpa, Jew's Harp, Wooden Flute, Willow Pipe
Björn Tollin: Frame Drum, Marxophone, Three-String Keyed Fiddle
Hållbus Totte Mattsson: Lute, Acoustic Guitar, Baroque Guitar, Hurdy Gurdy

1989 debut albums
Hedningarna albums